Antimony(III) acetate is the compound of antimony with the chemical formula of Sb(CH3CO2)3. It is a white powder, is moderately water-soluble, and is used as a catalyst in the production of polyesters.

Preparation
It can be prepared by the reaction of antimony(III) oxide with acetic anhydride:

Sb2O3  +  3 C4H6O3  →   2 Sb(CH3CO2)3

Structure
The crystal structure of antimony(III) acetate has been determined by X-ray crystallography. It consists of discrete Sb(OAc)3 monomers with monodentate acetate ligands. The monomers are linked together into chains by weaker C=O···Sb intermolecular interactions.

References

Antimony(III) compounds
Acetates